Kapp Klaveness is a headland at the west coast of Wedel Jarlsberg Land at Spitsbergen, Svalbard. It is named after ship owner Anton Klaveness.

References

Headlands of Spitsbergen